I Love You So Much is a 2012 Taiwanese romantic-comedy television series. The television drama was produced by Meng Tian Chong Production Company, starring Lan Cheng-lung, Nick Chou and Li Jia Ying. It was first aired on January 29, 2012 on CTS.

The series was nominated for the Best Art and Design Award at the 47th Golden Bell Awards.

Synopsis
Xia Le Di (Li Jia Ying) was an arrogant, self-absorbed socialite. Soon after, her father's business went bankrupt and left her penniless. She believed that it happened because his competitor, JEALOUS, stole "Mona Lisa", a revolutionary makeup technology that her father's company developed. Therefore, she vowed to get it back. She went undercover at JEALOUS, the rival company, working as an assistant to Chang Yu Jie (Lan Cheng Long), the heartless operation manager and lead makeup artist. While she focused her investigation on him, her romantic interest wandered to his charming half-brother Chang Shao Feng (Nick Chou). Will she ever get "Mona Lisa" and her family's company back?

Cast

Main
 Lan Cheng-lung as Chang Yu Jie
 Li Jia Ying as Xia Le Di
 Nick Chou as Chang Shao Feng
 Shara Lin as Wen Xi/ Cola
 Mao Di as Mao Di
 Tom Price as Daniel

Supporting
Ji Qin as Zeng Na Mei 
Mi Ke Bai (by Luo Ke Shu 
Dong Zhi Cheng as Zhuang Ying Xiong 
Chris Wu as Bu Hao Wen 
Lin Jun Yong 
Angie Tang as Grandma Chang
Ding Qiang
George Zhang
Patty Wu 
Lance Yu as Mr. Zhuang
Zhang Jun Ming as Ming Li

Broadcast

Soundtrack

I Love You so Much Original Soundtrack (粉愛粉愛你 電視原聲帶) was released on April 17, 2012 by various artists under Gold Typhoon Taiwan. It contains eleven songs, in which two of them are instrumental versions of the opening and ending songs. The opening theme song is "Ai Zhou Xiu" or "Love is a Show" by Show Lo, while the ending theme song is by Nick Chou entitled "i Wan Fen Zhi Yi De Ji Lu" or "One Out Of A Million".

Track listing

Other multimedia
Game APP - I Love You so Much - Quiz Buzz ² (遊戲APP：粉愛粉愛你 – Quiz叮咚²)
The Game APP is a makeup knowledge quiz games created with the cooperation of Daewoo and iOS platform. In the game, players will play the heroine, studying the beauty and career advancement of knowledge from the four Jealous' makeup artists (J4). The App was released on February 23, 2012 in Apple's App Store shelves.

Ratings
I Love You so Much ranked third in its pilot episode, until it gradually goes to the second spot on the last half of the series, with a total average of 1.00. Its drama competitors were TTV's Office Girls and Love Forward, CTS's Laoba Jiadao, and FTV's Skip Beat! and Absolute Darling. The viewers survey was conducted by AGB Nielsen.

Awards and nominations

Further reading

References

External links
 I Love You so Much Official Website on CTS
I Love You so Much Official blog
I Love You so Much website

Chinese Television System original programming
2012 Taiwanese television series debuts
2012 Taiwanese television series endings
Taiwanese romantic comedy television series